Konstantin Kapıdağlı, born Konstantinos Kyzikinos, was a Ottoman Greek court painter from the late 18th century to the early 19th century. Most of his works were created around 1789–1806.

Kapıdağlı's set of Ottoman sultan portraits are known as the Kapıdağlı series (1804–1806). Most of the sultans were deceased at the time of creation, and hence the faces are idealistic and imaginative. Unlike previous sultan portraits, this series housed the sultans in a frame, with additional imagery below depicting a scene from the sultan's life. This style set an example after which other 19th-century sultan portraits will follow. The series are kept at the Topkapı Palace in Istanbul.

Kapıdağlı was commissioned by Sultan Selim III to draw engravings of Ottoman sultans. However, following Selim III's deposition in 1807, the commission was cancelled. The project resumed with John Young, who published his Series of Portraits of the Emperors of Turkey in 1815 under the reign of Sultan Mahmud II.

Kapıdağlı's Sultan Selim III Enthroned at a Holiday Ceremony is one of the first oil on canvas painting by an Ottoman artist. He also experimented with three-dimensional perspectival construction, which were not common in Ottoman regions at the time (in contrast to European paintings).

Dates and places of his birth and death are unknown.

References

External links
 

Painters at the court of the Ottoman Empire
18th-century births
19th-century deaths
Date of birth unknown
Date of death unknown
Greeks from the Ottoman Empire
18th-century Greek painters
19th-century Greek painters
18th-century painters from the Ottoman Empire
19th-century painters from the Ottoman Empire